The 2016 season was Kedah FA's 8th season in the Malaysia Super League since its inception in 2004. They will also eligible to compete in FA Cup and Malaysia Cup.

Kit
Supplier: Warrix / Sponsor: Discover Kedah 2016, Syarikat Air Darul Aman (SADA), Perbadanan Kemajuan Negeri Kedah (Kedah State Development Corporation)

Players

Squad information 

Source: Facebook Kedah FAOrdered by squad number.

In

Out

Technical staff

Friendly matches

Pre-season

Current season

Competitions

Overall

Overview

Super League 
The league will kick-off on 13 February and ends on 22 October 2016.

League table

Results summary

Results by round

Fixtures and results 
Source:

First leg

Second leg

Results overview

As of matches played on 21 October 2016.

FA Cup 
The tournament will kick-off on 19 February 2016.

Results summary

Knockout phase

Round of 32

Round of 16

Quarter-finals

Semi-finals

Malaysia Cup 
The tournament will kick-off on 12 July 2016.

Results summary

Group stage

Knockout phase

Quarter-finals

Semi-finals

Final

Statistics

Squad statistics 
As of matches played on 30 October 2016.

Goalscorers 
As of matches played on 30 October 2016.

Clean sheets
As of matches played on 21 October 2016.

Disciplinary record

Suspensions 
A player is automatically suspended for the next match for the following offences:
 Receiving a red card (red card suspensions may be extended for serious offences)
 Receiving two yellow cards in two different matches (FA Cup, Malaysia Cup knockout phase)
 Receiving three yellow cards in three different matches (Super League, Malaysia Cup group stage)

As of matches played on 24 August 2016.

Summary

As of matches played on 30 October 2016.

Home attendance

Matches (all competitions)
All matches played at Darul Aman Stadium.

Matches designated as Home Team, but not played at Darul Aman Stadium.

Attendance (each competitions)

Awards

Monthly awards
For the 2016 season, sponsors collaboration with Kedah FA in recognizing the contributions of players throughout the season.
Every month one player will be selected as the player of the month based on the current performance.
Selection is based on the feedback of fans and squad management. Winners will be announced at 8:00pm at Darul Aman Stadium.
The winner will take home a plaque and a cash prize of RM500 contribution from the sponsors. (Cola Kedah – February, March & April) (Gold Perfume Factory – August & September)

Season awards
Kedah FA will inaugurate a player who was most prominent during the year based on fan votes. Kedah FA media will publish reviews and player statistics throughout the year in form of articles before voting is open to the fans after the last game for the team. The nominees was agreed by Head Coach, Tan Cheng Hoe and technical staff. Winners will be announced on Monday, 31 October from 8pm until 10pm at Istana Negara, Jalan Duta.Winners are listed first, highlighted in boldface, and indicated with a double dagger.

National awards
The Football Association of Malaysia National Football Awards are presented to the best football local and foreign players and coaches.

|-
|2016|| Syafiq Ahmad||Best Striker||
|-
|2016|| Baddrol Bakhtiar||Best Midfielder||
|-
|2016|| Syazwan Zainon||Best Midfielder||
|-
|2016|| Rizal Ghazali||Best Defender Award||
|-
|2016|| Tan Cheng Hoe||Best Coach||
|-
|2016|| Liridon Krasniqi||Best Foreign Players||
|-
|2016|| Amirul Hisyam||Best Young Players||
|-
|2016|| Farhan Roslan||Best Young Players||
|-
|2016|| Syafiq Ahmad||Best Young Players||
|-
|2016|| Kedah FA||Best Social Media||
|-
|2016|| Tan Cheng Hoe||The Best XI – Coach (fan vote)||
|-
|2016|| Rizal Ghazali||The Best XI – Left Defender (fan vote)||
|-
|2016|| Liridon Krasniqi||The Best XI – Midfielder (fan vote)||
|-
|2016|| Amirul Hisyam||The Best XI – Left Winger (fan vote)||
|-
|2016|| Liridon Krasniqi||Most Popular Player (fan vote)||
|-

References

External links 

Kedah
Kedah Darul Aman F.C.
Kedah Darul Aman F.C. seasons